The women's 4 x 100 metres relay at the 2012 African Championships in Athletics was held at the Stade Charles de Gaulle on 29 June.

Medalists

Records

Schedule

Results

Final

References

Results

Relay 4x100 Women
Relays at the African Championships in Athletics
2012 in women's athletics